Carlo de' Vecchi (1611 – 13 March 1673) was a Roman Catholic prelate who served as Titular Archbishop of Athenae (1667–1673)
and Bishop of Chiusi (1648–1657).

Biography
Carlo de' Vecchi was born in Siena, Italy in 1611. He held the degree of Doctor in utroque iure, and was a Referendary of the Tribunal of the Two Signatures.

He was ordained a priest in December 1647.

In 1644, he served as governor of Faenza.

On 2 March 1648, he was appointed Bishop of Chiusi by Pope Innocent X.
On 15 March 1648, he was consecrated bishop by Bernardino Spada, Cardinal-Priest of San Pietro in Vincoli, with Alfonso Maurelli, Archbishop of Cosenza, and Giovanni Francesco Passionei, Bishop of Pesaro, serving as co-consecrators. 
He served as until his resignation on 12 March 1657.

On 27 April 1667, he was appointed Titular Archbishop of Athens (Greece) by Pope Clement IX. As titular Archbishop of Athens, De'Vecchi held the office of Secretary of the Sacred Congregation of Bishops and Regulars in the Roman Curia.

He held the title of Archbishop of Athens until his death on 13 March 1673.

Episcopal succession
While bishop, he was the principal co-consecrator of:

References

External links and additional sources
 (for Chronology of Bishops) 
 (for Chronology of Bishops) 
 (for Chronology of Bishops) 
 (for Chronology of Bishops) 

17th-century Italian Roman Catholic titular archbishops
Bishops appointed by Pope Innocent X
Bishops appointed by Pope Clement IX
1611 births
1673 deaths
17th-century Italian Roman Catholic bishops
Bishops of Chiusi